The Amazing Race Canada 3 is the third season of The Amazing Race Canada, a reality game show based on the American series The Amazing Race. It features twelve teams of two, each with a pre-existing relationship in a race across Canada and across the world and is hosted by Jon Montgomery. The grand prize includes a  cash payout, "gas for life" from Petro-Canada, the opportunity to fly for a year anywhere Air Canada flies worldwide in Business Class, and two Chevrolet Colorado "Z71" Trucks.

The season premiere was aired on July 8, 2015, with the season finale airing on September 23, 2015.

Brothers Gino and Jesse Montani were the winners of this season.

Production

Development and filming

On September 23, 2014, CTV announced that the show was renewed for a third season during the second season reunion special.

Filming took place in May 2015 with racers spotted in the Okanagan on May 24. The finale was filmed on May 28 in Vancouver and Whistler, British Columbia.

This season, teams faced a brand new twist, called the Face Off, where teams had to compete head-to-head in a pre-determined challenge, where winning teams can move on to the next challenge, while the losing team had to wait for new challengers. The team who lost the last "Face Off" would face a time penalty. This could potentially dramatically alter the placement order of teams throughout legs of the season.  In an article for the official Amazing Race Canada CTV website, the "Face Off" was described as "first and exclusive" to the Canadian edition with host Jon Montgomery stating that they "invented" the twist despite having already been introduced under various names in at least five other Amazing Race editions worldwide.

This season featured sportscaster James Duthie, who helped the teams during the first Roadblock in Leg 1, and Jeopardy! host Alex Trebek, who greeted the teams at the Pit Stop of Leg 6 in his hometown of Sudbury, Ontario.

Casting
Casting began on November 24, 2014, and as in the previous two seasons, an online site was used for submission of applications and audition videos.

Broadcasting
Similar to the previous season, after episode 7, a special mid-season reunion/recap titled "After The Race" aired. Hosted again by James Duthie, the program reviewed the events of the first 7 episodes with the first 6 eliminated teams, minus Amanda who was unable to attend. Duthie hosted another "After The Race" immediately after the season finale with every contestant present to review the season as a whole.

Marketing
Scotiabank discontinued their sponsorship while BMO Financial Group became the newest sponsor.

Cast
The first three teams were revealed on June 15, 2015, with the rest named thereafter. The cast includes UFC mixed martial artist Elias Theodorou, footballer Nicholas "Nic" La Monaca, and former CFL player Neil Lumsden. Hamilton Elliott is the first transgender man to compete on The Amazing Race Canada. (Jervi Li of the inaugural season of The Amazing Race Philippines was the first transgender contestant overall.)

Elias Theodorou died on September 11, 2022 due to liver cancer at the age of 34.

Results
The following teams participated in this season, each listed along with their placements in each leg and relationships as identified by the program. Note that this table is not necessarily reflective of all content broadcast on television, owing to the inclusion or exclusion of some data. Placements are listed in finishing order:

A  placement with a dagger indicates that the team was eliminated.
An  placement with a double-dagger indicates that the team was the last to arrive at a pit stop in a non-elimination leg, and had to perform a Speed Bump task in the following leg.
 An italicized and underlined placement indicates that the team was the last to arrive at a pit stop, but there was no rest period at the pit stop and all teams were instructed to continue racing. There was no required Speed Bump task in the next leg.
A  indicates that the team won the Fast Forward.
An  indicates that the team used an Express Pass on that leg to bypass one of their tasks.
A  indicates that the team used the U-Turn and a  indicates the team on the receiving end of the U-Turn.
A  indicates the leg has the Face Off, while a  indicates the team that lost the Face Off.

Notes

Prizes
The prize for each leg is awarded to the first place team for that leg. Trips are sponsored by Air Canada and gas and loyalty program prizes provided by Petro-Canada.

Leg 1 – Two round-trip tickets to Rio de Janeiro, Brazil and 2.5 million "Petro points" good for six months of free gas supply
Leg 2 – Two round-trip tickets in Premium-Class to Delhi, India and six months of free gas supply
Leg 3 – Two round-trip tickets to Beijing, China and six months of free gas supply
Leg 4 – Two round-trip tickets to any Caribbean destination and six months of free gas supply.
Leg 5 – Two round-trip tickets to any Canadian destination and 5 million "Petro points" good for one year of free gas supply
Leg 6 – Two round-trip tickets to any California destination and one year of free gas supply.
Leg 7 – Two round-trip tickets to Paris, France and one year of free gas supply. Additionally, the winning team won Business Class seats for themselves and a team of their choice for the next leg.
Leg 8 – Two round-trip tickets to London, England and one year of free gas supply
Leg 9 – Two round-trip tickets to Amsterdam, Netherlands and one year of free gas supply
Leg 10 – Two round-trip tickets to Tokyo, Japan and 10 million "Petro points" good for two years of free gas supply
Leg 11 – Two round-trip tickets to Dubai, United Arab Emirates and two years of free gas supply
Leg 12 – A  cash payout, “gas for life” from Petro-Canada, the opportunity to fly for a year anywhere Air Canada flies worldwide in Business Class, and two Chevrolet Colorado trucks.
Canada's Favourite Racers – A year's supply of gas from Petro-Canada awarded to the "fan favourite" team (according to an online vote). Awarded to Dana & Amanda (with 2nd place in the vote, due to vote winners Gino & Jesse's season win which canceled out their poll win).

Race summary

Leg 1 (Quebec → Ontario)

Airdate: July 8, 2015
Quebec City, Quebec, Canada (Château Frontenac – Dufferin Terrace) (Starting Line)
 Quebec City (Quai 22 to Port of Quebec)
 Quebec City (Port of Quebec) to Lévis (Levis Ferry Terminal)
 Quebec City (Québec City Jean Lesage International Airport) to Toronto, Ontario (Toronto Pearson International Airport)
Toronto (St. Lawrence Market)
Toronto (9 Channel Nine Court – TSN Studios) 
Toronto (Ontario Place – Atlantis) 
Toronto (Air Canada Centre) 

In this season's first Roadblock, one team member had to dress in a suit and tie and learn from Kate Beirness how to properly deliver a sports broadcast from a teleprompter alongside TSN sportscaster James Duthie to receive their next clue from Duthie. If at any point, they made eye contact with the wrong camera or mispronounced a player's name, they would have to start over.

In this leg's second Roadblock, the team member who did not perform the previous Roadblock had to change into a wetsuit and complete a three-part obstacle course that involved climbing across a 120-foot cargo net, walking across a narrow plank and taking a three-story plunge into the water below, and finally crossing a slippery log to reach their next clue.

Additional tasks
At Quai 22, teams had to search among hundreds of locked bicycles to find two that a combination given in their clue unlocked. They then had to ride the bicycles to the ferry terminal, where they took the ferry across the St. Lawrence River to Lévis, after which they chose a Chevrolet Sonic RS containing their next clue and numbered one to twelve. Teams would then fly to Toronto, Ontario, on one of two separate flights with teams that secured cars #1–8 on the first flight that arrived an hour before the second with the remaining four teams.
At St. Lawrence Market, teams had to find a woman in a BMO shirt, who would give them their next clue, which instructed teams to solve a word scramble of the names of two "streets" inside the market: Centre Street and Market Street, which intersected in front of a butcher stall. There, a butcher would give them their next clue, with an enclosed BMO credit card that would serve as the teams' source of money for the rest of the season.

Leg 2 (Ontario → Chile)

Airdate: July 15, 2015
Toronto (Canoe Landing Park) (Pit Start)
 Toronto (Toronto Pearson International Airport) to Santiago, Chile (Arturo Merino Benítez International Airport)
Puente Alto (Parque Geoaventura) 
Santiago (San Miguel Open-Air Museum  – "Sanación Equilibrio")
Santiago (Recoleta – Centro Cultural Ángela Davis)
 Santiago (Barrio Bellavista – Patio Bellavista)
 Santiago (Plaza de Armas or National Library of Chile)
Santiago (San Cristóbal Hill – Jardín Botánico Mapulemu) 

In this leg's Roadblock, one team member would be taken up a mountain and had to perform a tandem paraglide into the skies of Santiago. Once they returned to the ground and reunited with their partner, a paragliding instructor would give them their next clue.

This season's first Detour was a choice between Motion or Emotion. In Motion, teams travelled to Plaza de Armas, where they had to strip down, dress up as the people of Easter Island, and perform a traditional Rapa Nui dance in front of a crowd to the satisfaction of the dance troupe leader to receive their next clue. In Emotion, teams travelled to the National Library of Chile, where they had to learn a verse from Gabriela Mistral's famous poem, Valle de Chile, and perfectly recite it in Spanish to a crowd to receive their next clue. Hamilton & Michaelia immediately used their Express Pass to bypass the Detour.

Additional tasks
At the Sanación Equilibrio mural, teams had to search for five specific murals and take a selfie in front of each. Once all five selfies were completed, they had to show them to the museum curator, who would give them a wooden box listing their next destination.
At Centro Cultural Ángela Davis, teams had to work with a child to help paint a section of a new mural, with the colors needed to be painted written in Spanish. Once they finished, teams would give their wooden box, which contained a set of new art supplies, to the child they worked with in exchange for their next clue.
Teams had a chance to receive two Express Passes by travelling to Patio Bellavista at Barrio Bellavista and be the first team to find Bailarines de Cueca to pick them up, risking valuable time and possible elimination.

Leg 3 (Chile → Argentina)

Airdate: July 22, 2015
 Santiago (Arturo Merino Benítez International Airport) to Buenos Aires, Argentina (Ministro Pistarini International Airport)
Buenos Aires (Plaza Canadá)
Buenos Aires (La Boca –  ) 
Buenos Aires (Fútbol Madero)
Buenos Aires (Plaza de la República – El Obelisco)
 Buenos Aires (Confitería Ideal or La Estancia)
Buenos Aires (Puerto Madero overlooking Puente de la Mujer) 

In this leg's Roadblock, one team member had to collect packs of sponsor Mentos' candies labeled with letters from 3 stores and bring them to a puzzle board in the neighborhood playground. They then had to figure out clues on a board to spell out the names of four famous Argentine people: (1) Argentina's most famous first lady (Eva Perón); (2) The first Pope from the Americas (Pope Francis); (3) La Boca's favorite footballer (Diego Maradona); and (4) The King of Tango (Carlos Gardel). Once all of the answers were right, teams would receive their next clue.

This leg's Detour was a choice between Dance or Dine, each with a limit of 6 stations. In Dance, teams travelled to Confitería Ideal, where both team members had to change into the traditional attire and learn to perform a complex tango routine to the satisfaction of the judge to receive their next clue. In Dine, teams travelled to La Estancia, where they had to serve asado with one member as the server and the other as the chef. The server had to memorize orders in Spanish from three patrons, collect the dishes from the chef, who had to memorize the names of 12 items and serve the food listed by the server, and serve the patrons their orders to receive their next clue.

Additional tasks
Upon arrival in Buenos Aires, teams had to find a totem pole carved from a British Columbia red cedar at Plaza Canadá to get their next clue.
At Futbol Madero, teams had to participate in the sport of blind soccer. One team member had to wear a blindfold and navigate a soccer ball through pylons then shoot it into the net while their partner gave them directions. If the team member could score a goal in under one minute, a coach would give them their next clue.

Leg 4 (Argentina → Nova Scotia)

Airdate: July 29, 2015
 Buenos Aires (Ministro Pistarini International Airport) to Halifax, Nova Scotia, Canada (Halifax Stanfield International Airport)
Halifax (Halifax Central Library)
 Halifax (Angus L. Macdonald Bridge)
Halifax (Citadel Hill)
Halifax (Halifax Public Gardens)
 Halifax (Dalhousie University – Aquatron Laboratory or Garrison Brewing Company)
Halifax (Rooftop of Halifax Seaport Farmers' Market) 

In this leg's Roadblock, one team member had to climb to the top of a  pillar of the Angus L. Macdonald Bridge and use binoculars to scan the city for a route marker. Once they spotted the route marker they had to figure out the location was at Citadel Hill where their next clue is located.

This leg's Detour was a choice between Bubbles or Suds. In Bubbles, teams travelled to the headquarters of Ocean Tracking Network, the Aquatron Laboratory, at Dalhousie University. There, both team members had to dive down to the bottom of the Aquatron, grab two lobsters each, and band and tag them with a tracking device that monitors movements to receive their next clue. In Suds, teams travelled to Garrison Brewing Company and had to find a delivery truck. They then had to deliver beer, on foot, to three pubs among the streets of Downtown Halifax. They also had to return two kegs from each location. Once all three beer orders were delivered and six kegs were returned, teams would get their next clue.

Additional tasks
Upon arrival in Halifax, teams had to find a woman standing at a BMO kiosk inside Halifax Stanfield International Airport with their next clue.
At the Halifax Library, teams had to correctly count the number of black and white smartphone images depicting the original library amongst over 5,000  paintings hanging on a wall (134) to receive their next clue from a librarian.
At a kiosk in the Halifax Public Gardens, teams had to taste five Orange Julius smoothies and correctly identify each flavor to receive their next clue.

Leg 5 (Nova Scotia → Quebec)

Airdate: August 5, 2015
Halifax (Statue of Edward Cornwallis) (Pit Start)
 Halifax (Halifax Stanfield International Airport) to Havre-aux-Maisons, Les Îles-de-la-Madeleine, Magdalen Islands, Quebec (Îles-de-la-Madeleine Airport)
Dune-du-Sud (Plage de la Dune-du-Sud) 
L'Étang-du-Nord (Monument aux Pêcheurs) 
 Fatima (Centre Équestre La Crinière au Vent) or Pointe-Basse (La Ferme Léo et Fils)
Cap-aux-Meules (L'Escalier de la Pointe aux Meules) 
Grosse-Île (Pointe Old-Harry) 

In this leg's Roadblock, one team member had to bury their non-participating partner beneath the sand, with only their head visible, then, using a sample for reference, re-create a sandcastle around them to receive their next clue.

For this series' first Face Off, teams had to compete against each other in a head-to-head kayak hockey game. The first team to score two goals would win the challenge and receive their next clue, while the losing team would have to wait for another opponent to arrive and try again, and the last team at the Face Off would have to wait out a pre-determined time penalty before they could continue.

This leg's Detour was a choice between Ride It or Pull It.  In Ride It, teams travelled to Centre Équestree La Crinière au Vent, where they had to master the equestrian art of dressage form by mounting a horse and riding an obstacle course. If both team members finished in a combined time of eight minutes or less, an equestrian rider would give them their next clue. In Pull It, teams travelled to La Ferme Léo et Fils, where they had to roll a  bale of hay from a pasture into a barn then milk a cow by hand until each team member filled a one-litre bottle to receive their next clue.

Additional task
Upon arrival in Les Îles-de-la-Madeleine, teams had to choose a Chevrolet Colorado with a clue on the center console, instructing them to use pictures for reference to pack their truck with items (two kayaks, sandcastle building supplies, and camping equipment) needed for the rest of the leg before driving to Plage de la Dune-du-Sud to find their next clue.

Leg 6 (Quebec → Ontario)

Airdate: August 12, 2015
 Cap-aux-Meules (Port de Cap-aux-Meules) to Souris, Prince Edward Island (Souris Harbour)
 Charlottetown (Charlottetown Airport) to Sudbury, Ontario (Greater Sudbury Airport)
Sudbury (Copper Cliff – Vale Mining Company)
Sudbury (Big Nickel)
 Sudbury (Science North)
 Sudbury (Laurentian University – Forensics Training Facility or Jeno Tihanyi Olympic Gold Pool) 
Sudbury (Health Sciences North – Sudbury Outpatient Centre) 
 Sudbury (Ramsey Lake – Vale Living with Lakes Research Centre to Bell Park Gazebo) 

In this season's only Fast Forward, teams had to feed a Blanding's turtle a tray of mealworms, crickets and superworms, and then each team member had to eat the same dish themselves. The first team to finish would win the Fast Forward award. Gino & Jesse won the Fast Forward.

This leg's Detour at Laurentian University was a choice between Analyze or Synchronize, each with a limit of four stations. In Analyze, teams had to find the Forensics Training Facility, where they had to locate 10 pieces of bones and teeth inside a simulated crime scene, mark each spot with a flag, measure the locations, and graph each piece to scale on an evidence sheet to receive their next clue from a crime scene analyst. In Synchronize, teams had to find the Jeno Tihanyi Olympic Gold Pool, where they had to learn and correctly perform a synchronized swimming routine with the Sudbury Synchro Swim Club to receive their next clue from the coach.

In this leg's Roadblock, one team member had to learn CPR from a video, enter a life simulation lab, and correctly perform CPR for two minutes on a state-of-the-art computerized mannequin to receive their next clue from a doctor.

Additional tasks
After travelling via ferry to Souris, Prince Edward Island and driving themselves to Charlottetown Airport to fly to Sudbury, Ontario, teams had to choose a marked Chevrolet Trax and drive themselves to Vale Mining Company, where they had to lineup and wait for a miner with their next clue.

Leg 7 (Ontario → Saskatchewan)

Airdate: August 19, 2015
Sudbury (Bridge of Nations) (Pit Start)
 Sudbury (Greater Sudbury Airport) to Saskatoon, Saskatchewan (Saskatoon John G. Diefenbaker International Airport)
 Saskatoon (Apex Trampoline Park)
Saskatoon (Great Western Brewing Company)
 RM of Corman Park (Wanuskewin Heritage Park)
RM of Corman Park (Wanuskewin Heritage Park – Sunburn Tipi Rings) 

In this leg's Roadblock, one team member had to complete a three-part trampoline course. First they had to bounce sequentially on nine trampolines in the correct order and without touching any surrounding mats, then jump over a foam wall without knocking it over, and finally jump high enough to ring a bell to receive their next clue.

This leg's Detour was a choice between Nimitook or Mikwap. For both tasks, teams had to travel to Wanuskewin Heritage Park to take part in the daily aspects in the life of Northern Plains Indians culture. In Nimitook, teams had to perform a traditional hoop dance. Using a professional hoop dancer for guidance, team members had to dance to the beat of a traditional drum while making five spiritually symbolic shapes to receive their next clue. In Mikwap, teams had to correctly build a teepee using the tools provided and a shown model to receive their next clue from the elder.

Additional tasks
On the tarmac of Saskatoon's John G. Diefenbaker International Airport, teams had to prepare a flight plan using flight boards that listed routes from Air Canada destinations from around the world, flight departure and arrival times, and the time zone of each destination. Once teams prepared a flight plan that travelled to at least three continents and totaled 25 hours of flight time, they would receive their next clue. Brent & Sean used the Express Pass given to them by Hamilton & Michaelia to bypass this task.
Teams' clue after the Roadblock was simply a bottle cap leaving them to figure out that it was from the Great Western Brewing Company, where they would find their next clue instructing them to search a bin of over 5,000 caps for 15 original Pale Ale bottle caps matching the one given in their clue to receive their next clue.
After the Detour, teams were instructed to travel on foot to the park's lookout point at the Sunburn tipi rings near the medicine wheel to find the Pit Stop.

Additional note
After teams completed the flight plan task, they were provided with a Chevrolet Cruze LTZ, which served as their transportation for the rest of this leg.

Leg 8 (Saskatchewan → India)

Airdate: August 26, 2015
Saskatoon (Kiwanis Memorial Park – Canada Games Memorial Clock Tower) (Pit Start)
 Saskatoon (Saskatoon John G. Diefenbaker International Airport) to Kolkata, India (Netaji Subhas Chandra Bose International Airport)
Kolkata (Mallick Ghat Flower Market)
 Kolkata (Armenian Ferry Ghat to Bagbazar Ghat)
 Kolkata (Kumartuli Potters' Colony)
Kolkata (Swami Vivekananda House and Cultural Centre)
 Kolkata (Jorasanko Thakur Bari or University Institute Hall)
Kolkata (National Library of India) 

In this leg's Roadblock, one team member had to search a stall containing many figurines of the Hindu goddess Lakshmi to find one with a single difference that matched the one in a photograph enclosed in their clue to receive their next clue.

This leg's Detour was a choice between Tuck or Roll. In Tuck, teams travelled to Jorasanko Thakur Bari, where they had to learn six couples' yoga poses. Once teams correctly performed all six, the guru Yogi Biswa would give them their next clue. In Roll, teams travelled to University Institute Hall where, using a rickshaw, they had to navigate Kolkata's crowded streets to make two deliveries to different locations: a load of plastic bottles to a soda shop, and bundles of cloth to a decorating store. Once both deliveries were successfully completed, teams could return the rickshaw in exchange for their next clue.

Additional tasks
At the Mallick Ghat Flower Market, teams received a traditional blessing and their next clue, which instructed them to string differently-coloured fresh flowers together to create a garland, following the pattern of a completed example, to receive their next clue.
After the flower task, teams had to travel by foot to Armenian Ferry Ghat, where they would then take the ferry across the Hooghly River to Bagbazar Ghat, where they would find their next clue.

Additional note
For winning the previous leg, Brent & Sean received a free upgrade to Business Class for them and a team of their choosing, which was given to Dujean & Leilani.

Leg 9 (India)

Airdate: September 2, 2015
Kolkata (Oberoi Grand Hotel) (Pit Start)
 Kolkata (Netaji Subhas Chandra Bose International Airport) to Delhi (Indira Gandhi International Airport)
Delhi (Ghazipur Fish Market)
Delhi (Faily-Bartha Village) 
Delhi (Greater Kailash – M-Block Market)
 Delhi (Roshanara Garden Wrestling Club or Khari Baoli Spice Market)
Delhi (Humayun's Tomb) 

In this leg's Roadblock, one team member had to properly wrap three different styles of turbans onto the heads of waiting men for a traditional wedding party to receive their next clue.

This leg's Detour was a choice between Slam It or Spice It. In Slam It, teams travelled to Roshanara Garden Wrestling Club, where they had to learn a series of seven traditional kushti wrestling moves in sequence from a pehlwan and then correctly perform it for a judge to receive their next clue. In Spice It, teams travelled to Khari Baoli and had to find a spice vendor, where they would use a mortar and pestle to grind eye-watering chilis into a fine powder of at least  to receive their next clue.

Additional tasks
At Ghazipur Fish Market, each team member had to deliver 20 live catfish by carrying them in a basket above their heads to receive their next clue.
In an unaired portion at the Pit Stop, teams were required to donate all their money to a charity box before they could check in.

Leg 10 (India → British Columbia)

Airdate: September 9, 2015
 Delhi (Indira Gandhi International Airport) to Penticton, Okanagan Valley, British Columbia, Canada (Penticton Regional Airport)
Penticton (D'Angelo Estate Winery) 
Summerland (Summerland Waterfront Resort) 
Oliver (Covert Farms)   
Osoyoos (Osoyoos Desert Model Railroad)
Osoyoos (Nk'Mip Desert Cultural Centre) 

In this leg's Roadblock, one team member had to ride a wakeboard, while their non-participating partner rode in the motorboat, and complete a course on Lake Okanagan that included a flat ramp followed by a steep one without falling off to receive their next clue from James the instructor.

For their Speed Bump, Brent & Sean had to fill, cork, and label a dozen bottles of wine, then properly dip the neck of each bottle in wax to create a seal before they could continue racing.

This leg's Detour was a choice between Brains or Brawn. In Brains, teams had to use provided coordinates to search a vineyard for three bottles of wine. Then, they had to use a giant slingshot to launch a potato at a target. Finally, they had to operate a forklift to stack ten wooden pallets. In Brawn, teams had to carry and toss ten  bags of onions onto the back of a truck. Then, they had to flip a large tractor tire 100 meters and place it on a rack. Finally, they had to simultaneously cross monkey bars over a pile of a manure.

Additional tasks
At the D'Angelo Estate Winery, teams had to drive a white Chevrolet Silverado, their transportation for this leg, through a large maze by moving the surrounding black Silveradoes in either a forward or reverse direction, using the rear-view camera, only. Once freed, teams then had to drive to Summerland Waterfront Resort to find their next clue.
After either Detour, teams had to complete the Freak’n Farmer mud run, crawling under barbed wire, then ducking under a log while wading through muddy water to find the U-Turn board and their next clue.
At the Osoyoos Desert Model Railroad, teams had to search among 18,000 tiny hand-painted figurines for a "Mini-Jon" Montgomery figurine holding a clue inside the model train set and use a magnifying glass to see that the clue read "NK'MIP", referring to this leg's Pit Stop at the Nk'Mip Desert Cultural Centre.

Leg 11 (British Columbia → Alberta)

Airdate: September 17, 2015
Osoyoos (Spotted Lake) (Pit Start)
 Penticton (Penticton Regional Airport) to Edmonton, Alberta  (Edmonton International Airport)
Edmonton (Churchill Square – Edmonton City Hall)
Edmonton (Edmonton Waste Management Centre) 
 Edmonton (Ottewell – Ottewell Curling Club)
St. Albert (Petro-Canada Gas Station)
Edmonton (Fort Edmonton Park – Kelly's Saloon) 
Edmonton (Cloverdale – Muttart Conservatory) 

This season's final Detour was a Blind Detour, where teams would learn about the task they chose at its location, and was a choice between Paper or Plastic. In Paper, teams had to sort recyclables from a fast-moving conveyor belt into two bins, one for paper and another for non-paper items, then weigh them once filled. If both bins weighed at least  each, teams would receive their next clue. In Plastic, teams had to carefully dismantle six dead cathode-ray tube television sets and separate the specific components to receive their next clue. If they broke any components, they would have to get another television.

In this season's second Face Off, teams had to compete against each other in a game of curling. One team member would deliver the stone while their partner would sweep it as close as possible to the centre of the target, or "button", at the end. After 8 stones each, the team whose stone was closest to the centre of the button would win their next clue. The last team at the Face Off would have to turn over an hourglass and wait for the sand to run out before they could continue racing.

In this leg's Roadblock, one team member had memorize a script for a historical reenactment of a liquor licence raid and play the role of "Kelly", the proprietor/bartender, without any mistakes to receive their next clue.

Additional tasks
At Edmonton City Hall, teams had to find the justice of the peace, who was performing a wedding ceremony, and interrupt her to receive their next clue. 
At the Petro-Canada gas station in St. Albert, each team was given a Petro-Points card loaded with 250,000 points and had to spend all the points in the store on snacks and drinks only within 90 seconds to receive their next clue.

Leg 12 (Alberta → British Columbia)

Airdate: September 23, 2015
Edmonton (Art Gallery of Alberta) (Pit Start)
 Edmonton (Edmonton International Airport) to Vancouver, British Columbia (Vancouver International Airport)
Vancouver (BC Place – Terry Fox Plaza) 
Whistler (Whistler Olympic Plaza)
Whistler (Squamish Lil'Wat Cultural Centre)
Whistler (Bearfoot Bistro)
 Whistler (Whistler Village Gondola to Whistler Mountain – Whistler Blackcomb)
 Whistler (Whistler Mountain – Whistler Blackcomb, Blackcomb Peak, and Momentum Ski Camp)
Whistler (Nicklaus North Golf Course) 

In this season's final Roadblock, the team member who did not perform the previous Roadblock was given a single ski of specific height and binding size and had to search among thousands of skis on racks for the one that completes the set. Once an instructor confirmed that they had a matching pair, both team members had to ride the Peak 2 Peak Gondola to Blackcomb Peak and make their way to Momentum Ski Camp. For the second part of the Roadblock, the participating team member had to ski down a ramp and successfully complete a ski jump into a pool to receive their final clue.

Additional tasks
At Squamish Lil'Wat Cultural Centre, teams had to use a length of string corresponding to the scale found on a large world map to measure the total distance of the 12 legs travelled in miles, then use a whiteboard to convert it to kilometres. If their calculation was within five percent of the correct answer, they would receive their next clue.
At Bearfoot Bistro, each team member had to sabre off the cork of two champagne bottles, one with a traditional sabre, then one with the base of a champagne flute, to receive their next clue.

Episode title quotes
Episode titles are often taken from quotes made by the racers.
"Now Who's Feeling Sporty" – Non-Racer 
"We're Going to Dance!" – Brian
"I Said Straight, You Gorilla!" – Nick
"We Know Where They Live" – Sean
"The Face Off" – Non-Racer 
"Who is Alex Trebek?" – Non-Racer 
"I Dream About Eating Sandwiches" – Nick
"All of These are the Same" – Brian
"Take Your Clue and Gooo!" – Non-Racer 
"Man I've Got a Big Butt" – Jesse
"Cabotage" – Matt
"Here's to You, Canada...Cheers" – Jon Montgomery

Ratings

Notes

References

External links

 03
2015 Canadian television seasons
Television shows filmed in Quebec
Television shows filmed in Ontario
Television shows filmed in Chile
Television shows filmed in Argentina
Television shows filmed in Halifax, Nova Scotia
Television shows filmed in Prince Edward Island
Television shows filmed in Saskatchewan
Television shows filmed in India
Television shows filmed in British Columbia
Television shows filmed in Alberta